"Hansel and Gretel" is a fairy tale.

Hansel and Gretel may also refer to:
 Hansel and Gretel (opera), an 1893 opera by Engelbert Humperdinck
 Hänsel and Gretel (Black Lagoon), a pair of fictional characters in Black Lagoon

Film
 Hansel and Gretel: An Opera Fantasy, a 1954 American stop-motion animated film
 Hansel and Gretel (1954 Janssen film), a German live-action film by Walter Janssen
 Hansel and Gretel (1954 Genschow film), a German film by Fritz Genschow
 Hansel and Gretel (1963 film), an Australian TV adaptation of the opera Hansel and Gretel by Engelbert Humperdinck
 Hansel and Gretel (1987 film), a part of Cannon Movie Tales starring Cloris Leachman
 Hansel and Gretel (1996 film), an Australian animated television film produced by Burbank Animation Studios
 Hansel and Gretel (2002 film), an American film starring Jacob Smith and Taylor Momsen
 Hansel and Gretel (2007 film), a South Korean horror film
 Hansel & Gretel: Witch Hunters, a 2013 American action-horror film with comedy elements
 Hansel & Gretel (2013 film), a direct-to-video film

Television
 Hansel and Gretel (1958 TV special), an American live musical presentation
 Hansel and Gretel (1983 TV special), a Disney television film by Tim Burton
 "Hansel and Gretel" (Faerie Tale Theatre), a 1983 episode of Faerie Tale Theatre

See also 
 Gretel & Hansel, a 2020 American horror film
 Hanzel und Gretyl, an American industrial metal band
 List of films titled Hansel and Gretel